Marinette is the name of two United States Navy ships, both named after Marinette, Wisconsin;

 , a  littoral combat ship, expected to be commissioned in 2021.

United States Navy ship names